Patrick Henry "Patsy" Dougherty (October 27, 1876 – April 30, 1940) was a Major League Baseball outfielder from 1902 to 1911. He played for the Boston Americans (now the Boston Red Sox), the New York Highlanders (now the New York Yankees), and the Chicago White Sox.

On July 29, 1903, Dougherty became the second Red Sox player (then known as the Americans) to hit for the cycle. In Game 2 of the 1903 World Series, the first modern World Series, Dougherty became the first player to accomplish several feats; he became the first Boston player to hit a  World Series home run, the first player to hit two home runs in a single World Series game, and the first player to hit a leadoff inside-the-park home run in a World Series game (a feat not matched until the 2015 World Series, by Alcides Escobar of the Kansas City Royals in Game 1).

In a 10-year major league career, covering 1233 games, Dougherty compiled a .284 batting average (1294-for-4558) with 678 runs, 17 home runs, 413 RBI and 261 stolen bases. In his two postseason appearances, in the 1903 and '06 World Series, he batted .185 (10-for-54) with 2 home runs and 6 RBI.

Dougherty died in Bolivar, New York, at the age of 63 and was buried at St. Mary Catholic Cemetery in Bolivar.


See also
 List of Major League Baseball players to hit for the cycle
 List of Major League Baseball career stolen bases leaders
 List of Major League Baseball annual runs scored leaders
 List of Major League Baseball annual stolen base leaders

References

Further reading

External links 
, or Retrosheet
 

American League stolen base champions
Boston Americans players
Chicago White Sox players
New York Highlanders players
Major League Baseball left fielders
Bristol Braves players
Canandaigua Giants players
Olean (minor league baseball) players
Dayton Old Soldiers players
Los Angeles Angels (minor league) players
Bridgeport Orators players
Baseball players from New York (state)
People from Allegany County, New York
1876 births
1940 deaths